Cyperus imbecillis is a species of sedge that is endemic to New South Wales in eastern Australia.

The species was first formally described by the botanist Robert Brown in 1810.

See also
 List of Cyperus species

References

imbecillis
Taxa named by Robert Brown (botanist, born 1773)
Plants described in 1810
Flora of New South Wales